The Octagon is a 1980 American action martial arts film starring Chuck Norris, Karen Carlson and Lee Van Cleef. It was directed by Eric Karson and written by Paul Aaron and Leigh Chapman. The film involves a  martial artist (Chuck Norris) who must stop a group of terrorists trained in the ninja style by his half-brother (Tadashi Yamashita).

It was filmed in Los Angeles and released by the distribution wing of American Cinema Productions beginning August 15, 1980. It is notable for its  inventive use of 'voice over' effects to portray the inner life of Norris' character, Scott James. This was actor Richard Norton's film debut.

Plot

The film opens with a short scene at a private military training camp.  The main instructor, Katsumoto (Yuki Shimoda) tells the graduating class that all of their actions and whereabouts will be known and that if they do anything to expose or harm the group, they and their families will be killed.

The film then cuts to an assassination of a diplomat by members of the group.  One of the terrorists is shot by a bodyguard while the others escape.

Scott James (Chuck Norris), a retired karate champion, is attending a dance performance.  After the performance, he meets one of the dancers named Nancy (Kim Lankford).  He takes her out to dinner because he is interested in how she incorporated the martial arts into her routine.  She seems distant during the dinner and is more concerned about a recent assassination that took place abroad.  She wonders if "an American was killed".

Scott takes Nancy home, and he senses that someone is there.  The lights do not work as they enter, and then they are attacked by a group of ninja.  Scott fights them off, but they end up killing Nancy.  After he restores power to the house, he finds that the entire family has been killed.

The next day, Scott goes to see an old mercenary friend named McCarn (Lee Van Cleef).  Scott asks him if he knows about any ninja activity.  However, McCarn tells him, "If you are seeing ninja, you are seeing ghosts."  McCarn tries to recruit Scott to join his cause in eliminating terrorists, but Scott declines.

On his way back from McCarn's place, Scott encounters a rich lady named Justine (Karen Carlson), who managed to get her car stuck on the side of the road.  She asks Scott for help, and after he helps her, she takes his keys, forcing him to take a taxi back to her place to get them.

Scott goes back to Justine's house to get his keys, and she pretends to find them in her purse.  She offers to drive him back since "It would be the only decent thing to do."  Scott agrees, only on the condition that this time, he drives.

On their way back, Scott and Justine are chased by two cars.  Scott and Justine manage to evade their pursuers.  After Scott gets back to his car, Justine identifies one of the cars as being "her bodyguards." Scott then asks her out to dinner since she has now become "an object of concern".

Before their date, Scott goes back to McCarn's and notices that the car that was chasing them belonged to McCarn.  He confronts Justine, and she confesses that she hired McCarn to be her bodyguard because McCarn told her that Scott would not accept her offer of employment. She also wants him to kill a man named Seikura (Tadashi Yamashita).  She confesses that her father was killed by terrorists and that she has since been on a crusade to eliminate them.  She has managed to help "retire" two of the three main terrorist leaders, but Seikura remains.  Scott is insulted by her actions, and he promptly declines her offer and leaves.

Scott's friend, A.J. (Art Hindle) is a karate champion and feels frustrated by the recent terrorist attacks that have taken place both abroad and on Nancy.  He decides to start going after terrorists himself.  He tries to find a German terrorist, but that terrorist is killed by McCarn's men before A.J. can catch him.  McCarn then fills A.J. in on just who he is and his relationship to Scott.  He also tells A.J. that it was Nancy's brother who was killed in the terrorist attack abroad and that she was killed in retaliation.  A. J. decides to join McCarn's cause.

In a flashback Scott remembers training with his half brother Seikura.  He and his brother are seen running through an obstacle course to obtain a sword.  Scott stumbles at the end but still manages to get the sword.  However, his enraged brother grabs the sword and declares it to be his.  Scott's adoptive father (John Fujioka), then berates Seikura and disowns him.  He tells Scott that Seikura is now his enemy for life.

The movie cuts to a scene at the Octagon training camp where a new group of recruits has graduated.  One recruit, Aura (Carol Bagdasarian) has reservations about what she is doing but leaves the camp to report to a terrorist dispatcher named "Doggo" (Kurt Grayson).

Scott realizes that A.J. and McCarn are right, so he signs up and attends a mercenary recruiting camp in an attempt to be recruited so he can get to Seikura.  He gets interviewed at Doggo's camp, but Doggo knows his true identity, and he refuses his services.  Scott then has to fight his way out of Doggo's facility, defeating "Longlegs" (Richard Norton) and "Hatband" (Aaron Norris) and returns to his hotel.

Later that day, Aura grabs Scott's file and defects from Doggo's camp.  Meanwhile, Justine manages to recruit A.J. to find Seikura.  As Scott goes back to his room, he encounters Aura, and she tells him that she regrets what she has done and that she can lead him to Seikura's camp.  Justine then comes by to try once more to get Scott to help her, but she gives up after seeing Aura and decides to get Seikura herself.  As she goes out of the hotel with A.J., she is hit with a poisoned dart from one of Doggo's men and dies.  A.J. then leaves to find Seikura's place while McCarn stays behind to watch Scott.
A few hours later, several ninja are seen scaling the hotel.  They attack Scott and Aura but are defeated—the last shot by one of McCarn's men as he is descending the hotel.  A firefight then erupts between McCarn's men and Doggo's men, and all of Doggo's men are killed.  Scott and Aura then depart to Mexico for Seikura's terrorist camp. Realizing they may not survive, they have sex in a motel room before going in.

A.J. is then shown finding Seikura's place (located in Mexico or an unnamed Central American nation) the hard way, and he is eventually captured and taken prisoner.  Aura gets Scott to the compound, and Scott infiltrates the camp.  He is eventually discovered and led to an area known as "The Octagon" (a building filled with treacherous paths and enemies).  Scott fights his way through and ends up fighting Seikura's "enforcer" named "Kyo" (again, played by Richard Norton).  Scott defeats Kyo, and as a result, Seikura kills A.J. by slitting his throat.  Scott and Seikura fight, but Seikura escapes the compound.  Meanwhile, Aura infiltrates the compound and recruits several of her fellow former trainees to fight back and burn the compound to the ground. They end up destroying the entire camp. Aura then goes after Scott and Seikura.  As the sun is coming up, she sees Seikura attack Scott from behind.  However, Scott stabs Seikura with his sword and the movie ends with Scott standing over Seikura's body.

Cast

Release

Theatrical
The Octagon opened on 244 screens in Dallas, Kansas City, and St. Louis on 8 August 1980, before expanding into Los Angeles on 22 August 1980.

Reception

Critical response
Variety noted that the film "ought to keep the fans happy. A bizarre plot involving the Ninja cult of Oriental assassins with international terrorism provides plenty of chances for Norris and other martial art experts to do their stuff, and pic has a nicely stylized look with excellent lensing and music. Subtleties of writing and performing are not this film's selling points, so it would be misleading to belabor those inadequacies." Gene Siskel of the Chicago Tribune gave the film two-and-a-half stars out of four and wrote, "It has an understandable story with a little bit of sophistication, which immediately places it head and shoulders above the typical kung-fu chop-socky flick. Unfortunately, 'The Octagon' gets a little too complicated for its own good. There are a bunch of supporting characters who really aren't that crucial to the story, once it gets going in a straight line toward the ultimate confrontation between Scott James and his Oriental relative." Linda Gross of the Los Angeles Times wrote, "What is deeply disturbing about this movie is its inherent cynicism and wholesale endorsement of and commitment to violence. The screenplay by Leigh Chapman from a story by Chapman and Paul Aaron is predicated on the notion that pacifism causes violence and the only way to stop terrorism is to become a better fighter than your enemy, who in this case happens to be the hero's half-brother. The film also implies that if there are no wars around to fight, it's necessary to invent some." Joseph McLellan of The Washington Post wrote, "Clearly 'The Octagon' is no real threat to 'War and Peace' or even 'Beau Geste,' but it will appeal to those who are still in mourning for Bruce Lee, who like carefully choreographed fight scenes and who enjoy standing in front of a mirror looking at their muscles." Tim Pulleine of the Monthly Film Bulletin referred to the film as "routine martial arts hokum, too disjointedly assembled to compel much interest."

See also

 Chuck Norris filmography
 List of American films of 1980
 List of martial arts films

References

External links
 
 
 

1980 films
1980 action thriller films
American action thriller films
American martial arts films
Ninja films
1980 martial arts films
Japan in non-Japanese culture
Films directed by Eric Karson
1980s English-language films
1980s American films